Brickellia pringlei, or Pringle's brickellbush, is a North American species of flowering plants in the family Asteraceae. It is native to northern Mexico (Chihuahua, Sonora, Sinaloa) and the southwestern United States (southern Arizona).

Brickellia pringlei is abranching shrub up to 80 cm (24 inches) tall, growing from a woody caudex. It produces many small flower heads with pale yellow disc florets but no ray florets.

The species is named for American botanist Cyrus Guernsey Pringle (1838–1911).

References

pringlei
Flora of Arizona
Flora of Northwestern Mexico
Plants described in 1882